Yao Lianwei (1935 – October 2, 2012) was a Chinese male politician, who served as the vice chairperson of the Standing Committee of the National People's Congress.

References 

1935 births
2012 deaths
Vice Chairpersons of the National People's Congress